Simon Thelwall (1601–1659) was a Welsh politician who sat in the House of Commons at various times between 1640 and 1654. He fought in the Parliamentary army in the English Civil War.

Thelwall was the son of either Simon or Edward Thelwall of Plas-y-ward. He was admitted at Lincoln College, Oxford on 7 June 1616 aged 15. He was sworn a burgess of Denbigh of 31 March 1634, and was admitted to Inner Temple in November 1637.

In November 1640, Thelwall was elected Member of Parliament for Denbigh  in the Long Parliament. During the Civil War, he was driven out of Denbighshire and fled to Pembrokeshire. As Major Thelwall he helped drive the Royalists out of Pembrokeshire in 1643. He was one of the commanders who received the surrender of Denbigh Castle in 1646. He became a Deputy Lieutenant for Denbighshire on 2 July 1646 and became commissioner to manage Denbighshire in May 1648, was one of the Committee for North Wales in June 1648  and commissioner for pious uses for the use of the corporation on 17 November 1648. He was excluded from Parliament in December 1648 under Pride's Purge.  He was elected MP for Denbighshire in 1654 for the First Protectorate Parliament.
 
Thelwall married firstly Margaret Sheffield, daughter of Edmund Sheffield, 1st Earl of Mulgrave. He married secondly Dorothy Meredith, widow of Andrew Meredith of Glantared and daughter of John Owen Vychard of Llwydiarth. Lumley Thelwall was his brother.

References

1601 births
1659 deaths
Members of the Parliament of England (pre-1707) for constituencies in Wales
Roundheads
Alumni of Lincoln College, Oxford
Members of the Inner Temple
Members of the Parliament of England for Denbighshire
English MPs 1640–1648
English MPs 1654–1655